Thomas Cannuli is an American professional poker player, known for finishing 6th place in the 2015 WSOP Main Event and winning a WSOP bracelet in the $3,333 WSOP.com ONLINE No-Limit Hold'em High Roller.

A resident of Cape May, New Jersey, Cannuli graduated from Lower Cape May Regional High School in 2010.

World Series of Poker

References

External links
 Thomas Cannuli Hendon Mob profile

Living people
American poker players
World Series of Poker bracelet winners
People from Cape May, New Jersey
Year of birth missing (living people)